Perryville Battlefield State Historic Site is a  park near Perryville in Boyle County, Kentucky. The park continues to expand with purchases of parcels by the Office of Kentucky Nature Preserves' Kentucky Heritage Land Conservation Fund and the American Battlefield Trust. An interpretive museum is located near the site where many Confederate soldiers killed in the Battle of Perryville were buried. Additionally, monuments, interpretive signage, and cannons mark notable events that occurred during the battle. The site became part of the Kentucky State Park System in 1936.

Battle
The battle was fought on October 8, 1862, between the Union Army of the Ohio, commanded by Maj. Gen. Don Carlos Buell, and the Confederate Army of Mississippi, commanded by Gen. Braxton Bragg. The battle was a tactical victory for the Confederates, but a strategic victory for the Union because Bragg withdrew his army from Kentucky, which remained in Union hands for the remainder of the war.

Perryville's homes and farms were left in shambles by the battle. Henry P. "Squire" Bottom, a slave-owning Unionist on whose farm a significant portion of the battle was fought, suffered losses of pork, corn, hay, and wood to Union soldiers who remained in the area for weeks after the fighting. During the battle Bottom also had significant damage to his farm, including the loss of a substantial barn filled with hay that burned completely due to artillery fire from a Confederate battery.  Other accounts note that nearly all residents of the area suffered some losses as well as having their homes and outbuildings used as field hospitals.

The main force of the Union army had buried most of their dead in long trenches before pursuing Bragg, but most of the Confederate dead were still unburied a week after the battle. Union soldiers finally forced local residents to help them lay the dead in shallow trenches carved in the dry soil. Two months later, 347 were reburied in a mass grave on Bottom's land. In 1886 a total of 435 Confederates were buried on Bottom's land; this land was chosen because their dead lay thickest on the eastern slope. Although Bottom claimed that about 100 were identified, the only remnants of the cemetery were a corner of a stone wall and one headstone—that of Samuel H. Ransom of the 1st Tennessee Infantry CSA.

At the end of the war in 1865, Union soldiers reburied the remains of 969 Federal dead in a national cemetery at Perryville with a stone wall, two gates and plans for a monument. The monument was never erected, however, and in 1867 the new cemetery was closed and the Federal dead transferred to Camp Nelson in Jessamine County, Kentucky, leaving no identified Federal dead on the field at Perryville.

Memorial
On the fortieth anniversary of the battle in 1902, a Confederate monument was dedicated in the Confederate cemetery begun by Henry Bottom, and a smaller Federal memorial was erected nearby in 1931. The Perryville State Battlefield site was established in 1954 by the Kentucky State Conservation Commission, and a museum and visitor's center were opened near the monuments on the battle's one hundredth anniversary in 1962.

For a century following the war, the memory of the Battle of Perryville (and many others fought in the Western Theater) was minimized by what has been called the "Lee tradition," which emphasized the deeds of the armies and generals who fought in the Eastern Theater, particularly Virginia. Around the time of the American Civil War Centennial, however, numerous scholars worked to establish the importance of the Western campaigns. In recent years, appreciation for what happened at Perryville and other battlefields in Kentucky, Tennessee, and Mississippi has grown.

About  at Perryville were recognized as a National Historic Landmark in 1960, and the site averages around 100,000 visitors per year. A re-enactment of the battle occurs each October. The Perryville Battlefield Preservation Association was created in 1991 to preserve, enlarge, and protect the park. The acquisition of 149 acres (0.6 km²) of farmland from a descendant of Henry Bottom more than doubled the size of the park and allowed visitors to complete a tour of the entire battlefield. The American Battlefield Trust and its partners with the Office of Kentucky Nature Preserves Kentucky Heritage Land Conservation Fund have acquired and preserved 1,202 acres at the Perryville battlefield through late 2021. Numerous acres of this saved land have been incorporated in the state park.

In popular culture
Paranormal Investigators, Ghost Adventures visited the site where they found shadowy figures from the American Civil War walking through the fields. They revisited the site in 2013 and again in 2017.

References

Further reading
 Noe, Kenneth W., Perryville: This Grand Havoc of Battle, University Press of Kentucky, 2001, .

External links
 Perryville Battlefield State Historic Site Kentucky Department of Parks

Kentucky State Historic Sites
National Historic Landmarks in Kentucky
National Register of Historic Places in Boyle County, Kentucky
Protected areas established in 1936
American Civil War museums in Kentucky
Museums in Boyle County, Kentucky
Protected areas of Boyle County, Kentucky
Conflict sites on the National Register of Historic Places in Kentucky
American Civil War on the National Register of Historic Places
American Civil War battlefields